Zhang Yupu (born August 1962) is a Chinese politician who is the current chairman (governor) of Ningxia Hui Autonomous Region, in office since May 2022.

He was a delegate to the 12th National People's Congress and is a delegate to the 13th National People's Congress.

Early life and education
Zhang was born in Jinan, Shandong, in August 1962. After resuming the college entrance examination, in 1980, he entered Northeast Agricultural College (now Northeast Agricultural University), where he majored in agricultural mechanization.

Career in Heilongjiang
Zhang joined the Chinese Communist Party (CCP) in July 1984. After graduation in 1984, he was assigned to the Lanxi County Agricultural Machinery Repair and Manufacturing Factory in Heilongjiang, he served in several posts in the factory, including technician, deputy director of the office, and deputy factory director. He was an engineer and director of the office of Hulan County Automobile Repair Factory between August 1985 and March 1986.

Zhang got involved in politics in March 1986, when he was appointed head of the Office of the United Front Work Department of the CCP Hulan County Committee and deputy director of the Taiwan Work Office. In May 1990, he was transferred to the United Front Work Department of CCP Heilongjiang Provincial Committee and rose to become deputy head in October 2000.

Zhang was made head of the Organization Department of CCP Hegang Committee and secretary of the Enterprise Working Committee in April 2004 and was admitted to member of the Standing Committee of the CCP Hegang Municipal Committee, the city's top authority. Five months later, he was elevated to deputy party secretary of the city, concurrently holding the mayor position since March 2008. In February 2013, he was promoted to party secretary. It would be his first job as "first-in-charge" of a city. He also served as chairman of its People's Congress from June 2013 to March 2015. He was appointed party secretary of Mudanjiang in March 2015, concurrently serving as chairman of its People's Congress. He was appointed secretary-general of CCP Heilongjiang Provincial Committee, director of the General Office, secretary of the Working Committee of Organs Directly under the Provincial Government in September 2016 and three months later was admitted to member of the Standing Committee of the CCP Heilongjiang Provincial Committee, the province's top authority.

Career in Ningxia
In August 2021, he was promoted to party secretary of Yinchuan was admitted to member of the Standing Committee of the CCP Ningxia Regional Committee, the region's top authority. In May 2022, he was named acting chairman and later chairman of Ningxia Hui Autonomous Region, succeeding Xian Hui.

References

1962 births
Living people
People from Jinan
Northeast Agricultural University alumni
Harbin Normal University alumni
Harbin Institute of Technology alumni
People's Republic of China politicians from Shandong
Chinese Communist Party politicians from Shandong
Delegates to the 12th National People's Congress
Delegates to the 13th National People's Congress